Baecheon Jo clan was one of the Korean clans. Their Bon-gwan was in Paechon County, South Hwanghae Province. According to research in 2015, the number of members in the Baecheon Jo clan was 75978. He was the 3rd son of Zhao Dezhao, who was the eldest son of Emperor Taizu of Song of the Song dynasty. He immigrated to Goryeo in 979 in order to avoid conflicts (His father Dezhao had died that same year; his granduncle Emperor Taizong of Song had been a suspect in his father's and grandfather's deaths.), and was settled in Paechon County, Hwanghae Province. He served as Jinzi Guanglu Daifu during Hyeonjong of Goryeo’s reign.

See also 
 Korean clan names of foreign origin

References

External links 
 

 
Korean clan names of Chinese origin